Teun Beins (born 28 October 1998) is a Dutch field hockey player who plays as a defender or midfielder for Hoofdklasse club Bloemendaal and the Dutch national team.

Career

Club hockey
In the Dutch Hoofdklasse, Beins plays for Bloemendaal.

National teams

Under–21
Beins made his debut for the Netherlands U–21 team in 2017 during a test series against Germany in Mönchengladbach. Later that year he won a gold medal with the team at the EuroHockey Junior Championship in Valencia, Spain.

In 2019, two years after his debut, Beins returned to the junior national team at another EuroHockey Junior Championship, on this occasion winning a bronze medal.

Oranje
Teun Beins made his senior debut for the Oranje in 2019 during a season one of the FIH Pro League.

He has since gone on to make a number of appearances for the national team, before being named in the official squad for the first time in 2022. As a defender, Beins scored three times for the Orange squad from a penalty corner during the 2023 Men's FIH Hockey World Cup in India. Oranje won the bronze medal.

References

External links
 
 

1998 births
Living people
Dutch male field hockey players
Male field hockey defenders
HC Bloemendaal players
Men's Hoofdklasse Hockey players
HC Oranje-Rood players
2023 Men's FIH Hockey World Cup players
21st-century Dutch people